Strahovice is a municipality and village in Opava District in the Moravian-Silesian Region of the Czech Republic. It has about 900 inhabitants. It is part of the historic Hlučín Region.

History
The first written mention of Strahovice is from 1349.

Notable people
Richard Henkes (1900–1945), German priest; worked here in 1941–1943

Twin towns – sister cities

Strahovice is twinned with:
 Krzanowice, Poland
 Ruppach-Goldhausen, Germany

References

External links

Villages in Opava District
Hlučín Region